Wayne John Hernaman (born 15 May 1972) is a former Australian rules footballer who played twenty games for Richmond in the Australian Football League (AFL) between 1993 and 1994. He was recruited from the South Fremantle Football Club in the West Australian Football League (WAFL) with the 7th selection in the 1992 AFL Draft.

References

External links

Wayne Hernaman's playing statistics from WAFL Footy Facts

Living people
1972 births
Richmond Football Club players
South Fremantle Football Club players
Australian rules footballers from Western Australia